The Essential Dr. Hook & The Medicine Show is a compilation album by American rock band Dr. Hook & the Medicine Show, released in 2003 as a single disc, 14-track career-spanning anthology. It is part of Sony BMG's Essential series of compilation albums, and includes tracks from Dr Hook's five studio albums Dr. Hook, Sloppy Seconds, Bankrupt, A Little Bit More and Belly Up!.

Track listing

Release history

References

External links
Dr. Hook & The Medicine Show - The Essential Dr. Hook & The Medicine Show at Discogs

Dr. Hook & the Medicine Show compilation albums
2003 compilation albums
Columbia Records compilation albums
Albums produced by Ron Haffkine